The Last Bastion Station Trust, LLC is a privately owned trust company that temporarily owns 2 radio stations previously owned by Citadel Broadcasting. Citadel absorbed ABC Radio as well as 22 radio stations (not including ESPN Radio and Radio Disney O&O affiliates) on June 12, 2007 from The Walt Disney Company, which made Citadel Broadcasting the 3rd-largest radio company in the United States prior to the 2011 acquisition by Cumulus Media. However, in order to comply with the FCC ownership limitations, Citadel transferred 12 of its radio stations.

Stations
KOKY Sherwood, Arkansas
KPZK-FM Cabot, Arkansas

Former Last Bastion stations
 KARN-FM in Sheridan, Arkansas was originally on the list, but was later swapped back to Citadel for KOKY. KARN and KPZK, both in Little Rock, Arkansas, remained with Citadel even though the FM stations with those call signs were initially transferred to the trust and KPZK-FM remains there.
 Last Bastion swapped with Citadel once more in January 2008. KNEK-FM in Washington, Louisiana was swapped with KRDJ in New Iberia, Louisiana in the Lafayette, Louisiana market.
 WCLZ in North Yarmouth, Maine was one of the first stations to be sold, to Saga Communications.
WLUN (formerly WYLZ) Pinconning, Michigan was sold in March 2008 to the Great Lakes Loons minor league baseball team.
WMGL in Ravenel, South Carolina (Charleston market) was moved out of the trust after WNKT moved from the Charleston market into the nearby Columbia, South Carolina market.
WCYI Lewiston, Maine was sold in March 2008 to Educational Media Foundation to become part of its Air 1 networks. Previously simulcasted modern rock WCYY and for a short time adult alternative WCLZ. After sale of WCLZ, WCYI ran an automated Blues format.  The station has since become WARX.
KKWD Bethany, Oklahoma was re-absorbed into Citadel's portfolio on July 9, 2009 from the Last Bastion Trust, LLC, according to FCC documents. It was effectively acquired by Cumulus in merger with Citadel in late 2011.
KVLO in Humnoke, Arkansas was sold to Arkansas County Broadcasters, Inc. in January 2012, according to FCC records.
KBZU Albuquerque, New Mexico was reassigned to Cumulus Media effective April 30, 2013. Ironically, Cumulus has acquired Citadel Broadcasting in late 2011.
KRDJ New Iberia, Louisiana was sold to Bible Broadcasting Network (BBN). It was previously broadcasting an active rock format as "Rock 93.7". The station changed its callsign to KYFJ and returned to the air with a religious format on December 18, 2014.
KINB Kingfisher, Oklahoma was sold to Perry Publishing and Broadcasting on March 31, 2017.

See also
Aloha Station Trust, LLC

References

External links
Federal Communications Commission Document (.doc file)

Radio broadcasting companies of the United States